The Journal of Integrative Medicine is a bimonthly peer-reviewed medical journal covering all aspects of complementary and alternative and integrative medicine. It was established in 2003 as the Journal of Chinese Integrative Medicine and obtained its current title in 2013. It is published by Science Press in collaboration with Elsevier.

Scope 
Fields of particular interest to the journal include:

Manuscript Guidelines 
Article types include reviews, systematic reviews and meta-analyses, randomized controlled and pragmatic trials, translational and patient-centered effectiveness outcome studies, case series and reports, clinical trial protocols, preclinical and basic science studies, papers on methodology and CAM history or education, editorials, global views, commentaries, short communications, book reviews, conference proceedings, and letters to the editor.

Abstracting and indexing 
The journal is abstracted and indexed in Index medicus/MEDLINE/PubMed, ESCI, Excerpta Medica, Chemical Abstracts, JST China, Chinese Science Citation Database (CSCD), and China National Knowledge Infrastructure (CNKI).

References

External links 
 

Alternative and traditional medicine journals
Bimonthly journals
English-language journals
Publications established in 2003
Elsevier academic journals